Cottesloe Rugby Union Football Club, often shorted to "Cottesloe", "Cott" Cotts" or "The Seagulls", is a rugby union club based in Cottesloe, Perth, Western Australia. The club is the oldest club currently competing in the RugbyWA Fortescue Premier Grade, formed as "The Pirates" in 1893 and is older than the West Australian Rugby Union itself (RugbyWA). The club moved to Harvey Field in 1930 and have kept this as their home since. In 1930 the club also changed their colours to their current "Two Blue strip" and became known as the Seagulls or just "Gulls".

History

Early Years 
The club was originally formed in 1893 and donned a black jersey with the insignia of a skull and crossbones over the left breast. Until 1928, when the West Australian Rugby Union was formed, the club didn't play on a competition basis. When the club joined the WARU in 1928 they changed their name to the seagulls and retained the black and white jerseys for 2 years until adopting their current club colours that of the "Two Blue strips". When WW2 broke out most of the clubs disbanded (like a lot of clubs) and Cott combined with Perth (now Perth Bayswater) for a few years in a small competition. The club was reformed in 1948 by pre-war members.

Post War Years 
The 1950s were very successful for Cottesloe, achieving a minor Premiership in 1954 and major premiers in 1955 and 1956. The mid 60's was dire times fore Cottesloe, becoming a victim of the restructuring of the competition, players dwindled, debts were high and the death of the club looked near. The club borrowed money from the union, bought a set of jumpers and an SOS was sent out for players. Although the club finished last in the 1962 season, for the first time in their history, their debts had gone and the club was no longer in financial trouble. The club had an emphasis on schoolboy rugby, with many of the states best schoolboy players playing exclusively for Cottesloe. Up until 1963 the club trained on The Esplanade, sharing a small change room with Western Suburbs (Now Wests Scarborough). In 1964 training on Thursday nights was moved to Cottesloe and training on Tuesday nights continued at The Esplanade. In 1965, lights were installed at Cottesloe Oval and so the club moved there for training on both nights and for games. From 1971 to 1974, renovations at an old house on Broome Street, overlooking the pitch, became the clubs current clubhouse. The 1980s were a very successful time for the club, Premiers from 1984 to 1985 and again in 1988. The nineties saw another Premiership in 1992 and the formation of the Cottesloe Women's team (The Shegulls) in 1996 with them, themselves winning their first Premiership in 1999.

Honours (Since 1967) 

 Premier Grade (12)
1979, 1982, 1983, 1984, 1985, 1988, 1992, 2001, 2009, 2019, 2020, 2021

 Championship (Second) Grade (8)
1976, 1986, 1987, 1992, 1993, 1994, 2019, 2020

 Third Grade (6)
1977, 1987, 1990, 1994, 2003, 2008

 Fourth Grade (8)
1974, 1984, 1987, 1995, 1998, 2011, 2012, 2015

 Fifth Grade (2)
2013, 2014

 Colts (2)
1967, 2010

 Women's (5)
1998, 2005, 2006, 2013, 2021

Notable players
Men
 Dane Haylett-Petty – Western Force, .
 Ollie Hoskins – Western Force, .

Women
 Rebecca Clough – .
 Natasha Haines – .

References 

Rugby union teams in Western Australia
Rugby clubs established in 1893
1893 establishments in Australia
Cottesloe, Western Australia